The Perani Cup was an annual award given out at the conclusion of the Central Collegiate Hockey Association regular season to the player who finished with the most 'stars-of-the-game' points in CCHA play. While each school named a Perani Cup Champion, the official CCHA winner was the player who had the highest point total amongst all conference teams. points were calculated as 5 for a number one star, 3 for a number two star, and 1 for a number three star. Any player on the game roster was eligible to be star and only games between CCHA opponents would be counted towards the Perani Cup Standings. The three stars for each game are nominally selected by members of the home-team press.

The Perani Cup was first bestowed in 2003 and every year thereafter until 2013 when the CCHA was dissolved as a consequence of the Big Ten forming its men's ice hockey conference.

Award winners

Winners by school

Winners by position

See also
CCHA Awards

References

General

Specific

External links
CCHA Awards (Incomplete)

Central Collegiate Hockey Association
College ice hockey trophies and awards in the United States